Ladislao Odescalchi (22 January 1920 – 16 January 2000) was an Italian sports shooter. He competed in the 100 m running deer event at the 1952 Summer Olympics.

References

1920 births
2000 deaths
Italian male sport shooters
Olympic shooters of Italy
Shooters at the 1952 Summer Olympics
Sportspeople from Rome